Neuvéglise-sur-Truyère (literally Neuvéglise on Truyère; Auvergnat: Nòvaglèisa de Trueire) is a commune in the department of Cantal, south-central France. The municipality was established on 1 January 2017 by merger of the former communes of Neuvéglise (the seat), Lavastrie, Oradour and Sériers.

See also 
Communes of the Cantal department

References 

Communes of Cantal
Populated places established in 2017
2017 establishments in France